Renata Baymetova (born 9 August 1998) is an Uzbekistani professional racing cyclist, who last rode for the UCI Women's Team  during the 2019 women's road cycling season.

Major results
Sources:
2017
 National Road Championships
1st  Time trial
4th Road race
2018
 National Road Championships
1st  Time trial
3rd Road race
2019
 National Road Championships
2nd Time trial
2nd Road race
2020
 National Road Championships
2nd Time trial
3rd Road race

References

External links

1998 births
Living people
Uzbekistani female cyclists
Place of birth missing (living people)
Cyclists at the 2018 Asian Games
Asian Games competitors for Uzbekistan
21st-century Uzbekistani women